Michael Strong (1918–1980) was an American actor.

Michael Strong may also refer to:

Michael Strong (cricketer) (born 1974), English cricketer
Michael Strong, a judge of the County Court of Victoria
Michael P. Strong, fictional character in Murder at the ABA by Isaac Asimov